The Gulongtou Zhenwei Residence is a historical building in Jinning Township, Kinmen, Fujian, Republic of China.

History
The residence was built by the brother of Li Guang-hsien, a naval military personnel of the Qing Dynasty.

See also
 List of tourist attractions in Taiwan

References

Buildings and structures in Kinmen County
Houses in Taiwan
Jinning Township